Ammiga Himathongkom (born 29 November 1996) is a Thai swimmer.

In 2018, she represented Thailand at the 2018 Asian Games held in Jakarta, Indonesia.

In 2019, she represented Thailand at the 2019 World Aquatics Championships held in Gwangju, South Korea. She competed in the women's 800 metre freestyle event and she did not advance to compete in the final.

References 

Living people
1996 births
Place of birth missing (living people)
Ammiga Himathongkom
Ammiga Himathongkom
Swimmers at the 2018 Asian Games
Ammiga Himathongkom
Ammiga Himathongkom